The Holes is a 1974 French comedy film written and directed by Pierre Tchernia.

Cast
 Michel Serrault : Jean-Paul Rondin 
 Philippe Noiret : Gaspard de Montfermeil
 Michel Galabru : Commissaire Lalatte
 Charles Denner : The minister
 Prudence Harrington : Miss Pamela Pendleton-Pumkin
 Gérard Depardieu : The postman
 Chantal Goya : Marie-Hélène Rondin
 Roger Carel : Alberto Sopranelli
 Hubert Deschamps : Lestinguois
 Jean Carmet : Paul Bourru
 Annie Cordy : Ginette Lalatte
 Jacques Legras : Bougras
 Robert Rollis : Marcel Merlin
 Raymond Meunier : Mathieu
 Gérard Hernandez : Hervé Balzac

Awards 

 Saturn Award for Best Fantasy Film (1977)

External links
 

1974 comedy films
1974 films
French comedy films
Films with screenplays by René Goscinny
Films with screenplays by Pierre Tchernia
Films directed by Pierre Tchernia
1970s French-language films
1970s French films